Clare Ellen O'Neil (born 12 September 1980) is an Australian politician who is the Minister for Home Affairs and Minister for Cyber Security, since 2022. She is a member of the Australian Labor Party (ALP) and has been a member of the House of Representatives since 2013, representing the Victorian seat of Hotham. 

O'Neil was elected mayor of the City of Greater Dandenong in 2004, aged 23, becoming the youngest female mayor in Australian history. Before entering federal parliament she worked as a manager at McKinsey & Company. O'Neil was elected to parliament at the 2013 federal election. In 2016 she was appointed as a shadow minister by opposition leader Bill Shorten. She continued in the shadow ministry after Anthony Albanese succeeded Shorten as ALP leader in 2019.

Early life
O'Neil was born in Melbourne in 1980, the daughter of prolific Australian publishers Anne O'Donovan and Lloyd O'Neil. She undertook her VCE at Loreto Mandeville Hall in Toorak, where she later  served on the school council. She then undertook further education at Monash University, studying a Bachelor of Arts (History), and then a Bachelor of Laws, graduating with honours in both fields. In 2006, she was awarded a Fulbright Scholarship to undertake a Master of Public Policy at Harvard University's John F. Kennedy School of Government.

Career
O'Neil joined the Australian Labor Party at 16 and soon met Simon Crean, former party leader and her predecessor as the member for the division of Hotham. In her maiden speech, she described Crean as one of her "Labor heroes" and "a person in whose footsteps I am honoured to walk".

In March 2003, O'Neil ran as a candidate for Springvale South Ward in the City of Greater Dandenong and was subsequently elected. After one year in the position, she was also elected as mayor, becoming the youngest female mayor of a local government area in Australian history.

In 2007, while studying in the United States, O'Neil worked as an intern on the New York Stock Exchange; and in 2008 returned to Australia to serve briefly as an adviser to the Office of the Commonwealth Treasurer. She later worked at management consulting firm McKinsey & Company from 2009 to 2013 as an engagement manager.

Politics
O'Neil was endorsed as a late replacement candidate for the Australian Labor Party in Hotham at the 2013 Australian federal election, following the disendorsement of her friend Geoff Lake. She retained the seat for Labor and was quickly flagged by political commentator Peter van Onselen as a future front bencher.

O'Neil is a member of the Labor Right faction. From 2013 to 2016, she served on the House of Representatives standing committees on Agriculture and Industry and Tax and Revenue. Following the 2016 election, O'Neil was appointed to the shadow ministry under opposition leader Bill Shorten, becoming Shadow Minister for Justice. She was additionally made Shadow Minister for Financial Services in June 2018. After Labor lost the 2019 election, O'Neil considered standing for the deputy leadership of the party, but subsequently announced that she did not have enough support from her colleagues and would not contest the position. ABC News reported that she was persuaded to drop out in order to make way for fellow Victorian Right MP Richard Marles.

In 2022, O’Neil was appointed as Minister for Home Affairs and Cyber Security, being the first Cabinet Minister responsible for Cyber Security.

Cabinet Minister

Clare O'Neil has stated that Home Affairs must evolve to protect Australia's domestic security. As Minister for Home Affairs and Minister for Cyber Security, O'Neil's focuses include improving Australia's response to natural disasters from climate change, improving Australia's cyber security, countering foreign interference, reforming Australia's migration system, national resilience and strengthening Australia's democracy. She has stated that Australia's migration system is broken and is not serving the needs of Australia, business or migrants. On 2 September 2022, she announced a comprehensive review of Australia's migration system to address existing challenges and set a new direction for the coming decades. This review is scheduled to report their results in early 2023.

In Clare O'Neil's first six months as Minister for Cyber Security, Australia was subject to the Optus and Medibank cyber attacks which were at the time Australia's largest cyber attacks in Australia's history, within three weeks of each other.  As a result from these cyber attacks, a new joint task force was created to "hack the hackers" and disrupt cyber attacks in Australia before they were committed. O'Neil has announced a comprehensive review of the Optus and Medibank cyber attacks to look at how Home Affairs can learn from these cyber attacks and what policy reform needs to be done.  She has appointed a new expert advisory board to develop a new Cyber Security Strategy to improve Australia's national resilience to cyber threats and properly address the consequences of cyber incidents. Clare O'Neil was praised for leading the Albanese Government's response to the Optus and Medibank cyber attacks and her efforts to reform cyber security in Australia.  She was named 2022 Cybersecurity Person Of The Year by CyberCrime Magazine.

Political positions
In a 2013 interview with Michelle Grattan, O'Neil nominated four key areas as priorities for her in politics: economics, child welfare, women's issues, and the welfare of Indigenous Australians. She has also spoken on issues such as human rights violations in Cambodia, primary, secondary, and higher education, asylum seeker policy, and Australian Labor Party reform.

Economics
In her maiden speech O'Neil placed an emphasis on the importance of a strong economy in effecting a fair society and stemming disadvantage. She stated that while she believed "government should not be building great tariff walls or controlling the big macroeconomic levers", it did in practice provide "the platform on which our businesses compete – and win – globally" and that political leaders must therefore play a role in providing "good policy and clear communication" on the topic. O'Neil cites her family's history, work at McKinsey & Company, and experiences in indigenous communities as influential in shaping her views on the economy.

Indigenous Australians
In 2011 O'Neil spent nine months living with her partner in North East Arnhem Land, one of the northernmost regions of the Northern Territory, fostering a child and assisting local women to establish small businesses. During her time in the region she witnessed crises in health, housing, and employment; and she has since spoken in Parliament on her desire to see action taken to resolve them: "For many decades politicians have said it is shameful. I want my generation to be the last to have to say it."

Personal life
O'Neil lives with her partner Brendan, an anaesthetist. O'Neil has two sons, Elvis and Louis, and a daughter, Greta. While living in the Northern Territory, O'Neil and her partner also cared for a child as foster parents.

O'Neil previously lived in East Melbourne, outside her electorate, but bought a house in Oakleigh in 2020.

References

External links

 

1980 births
Living people
Mayors of places in Victoria (Australia)
Monash Law School alumni
Women mayors of places in Victoria (Australia)
Harvard Kennedy School alumni
Australian Labor Party members of the Parliament of Australia
Labor Right politicians
Members of the Australian House of Representatives
Members of the Australian House of Representatives for Hotham
Women members of the Australian House of Representatives
21st-century Australian politicians
21st-century Australian women politicians
Albanese Government
Politicians from Melbourne
People educated at Loreto Mandeville Hall
Fulbright alumni